"Long Day" is the first single and second track from Matchbox 20's debut album, Yourself or Someone Like You (1996). The cover of the single features a parody of a Diamond Matches box. The song peaked at number eight on the US Mainstream Rock Tracks chart and stayed in the top 10 for seven weeks. The song also charted in Canada and Australia, reaching numbers 43 and 83, respectively.

Composition
The song begins with lead singer Rob Thomas drawing a breath before singing the first verse, joined by an acoustic guitar; the second half of the verse goes to electric guitar for the remainder of the song. The first half of the second pre-chorus has acoustic guitar again before the electric guitar comes back as the pre-chorus concludes.

Music video
The video for "Long Day" (directed by Roger Pistole), like most of the band's material centers around Matchbox Twenty, but is punctuated by black and white shots from an old movie. Thomas has shorter hair than in the subsequent clips and is dressed in a suit and sunglasses.

Track listing
Australian maxi-CD single
 "Long Day" (radio edit)
 "Long Day" (acoustic)
 "3 AM" (acoustic version)
 "Long Day" (LP version)

Charts

References

1996 debut singles
1996 songs
Atlantic Records singles
Lava Records singles
Matchbox Twenty songs
Song recordings produced by Matt Serletic
Songs written by Rob Thomas (musician)